(literally "Ooh! Exploration Party") is a 1986 Japanese film directed by Kichitaro Negishi.

Plot
Tokiko Enomoto finds out that her husband Kazuya, who mostly lives at an apartment near his work while she and their children live at home, has been having an affair with a live-in mistress, Ryōko, at his apartment. Tokiko tells her two sons, Tarō and Jirō, that she has decided to divorce their father. The children are shocked but understand their mother's position. Kazuya realizes the damage he has done and tries to remedy the situation.

Cast
 Yukiyo Toake as Tokiko Enomoto
 Kunie Tanaka as Kazuya Enomoto
  as Tarō Enomoto
  as Jirō Enomoto
  as Ryōko
  as the photographer

Background
The screenplay for the film, based on a novel by Agata Hikari, was written by director Yoshimitsu Morita. The film has been described as "one of the forerunners of Japanese new age movies in the 80s."

Awards and nominations
10th Japan Academy Awards
 Nominated: Best Screenplay - Yoshimitsu Morita

8th Yokohama Film Festival 
 Won: Best Film
 Won: Best Screenplay - Yoshimitsu Morita

29th Blue Ribbon Awards
 Won: Best Film
 Won''': Best Actor - Kunie Tanaka

References

External links
 
 
 

1986 films
Films directed by Kichitaro Negishi
1980s Japanese-language films
Toho films
1980s Japanese films